Penistone is a market town and civil parish in the Metropolitan Borough of Barnsley, South Yorkshire, England, which had a population of 22,909 at the 2011 census. The town is frequently noted on lists of unusual place names.

The surrounding countryside is predominantly rural with farming on rich well-watered soil on mainly gentle slopes rising to the bleak moorland to the west of the town. Dry stone walls, small hamlets and farms surrounded by fields and livestock are synonymous with the area. The area is known for its rugged breed of sheep, the Whitefaced Woodland.

However, the surrounding land rises well over  towards Cubley and Thurlstone Moors and out towards smaller hamlets at Carlecotes, Victoria, Dunford and Crow Edge, elevated at points above . There are several vantage points around Penistone that afford panoramic views of the surrounding areas of West Yorkshire and North Derbyshire.

History

Etymology
The place-name Penistone is first attested in the Domesday Book of 1086, where it appears as Pengeston(e) and Pangeston; later sources record it as Peningston. It may mean "the farmstead at the hill called Penning", in reference to the high ridge immediately south of the town. This combines the Brittonic word penn (meaning a head, end, or height) with the Old English suffix ing and the word tun (meaning a farmstead or village).

Penistone has frequently been noted on lists of unusual place-names because it contains the letter sequence "penis"; however, those initial five letters are not pronounced like the name of the body part.

Medieval history
In 1066, the township was owned by Ailric. It was razed in 1069 in the Harrying of the North following the Norman Conquest; the Domesday Book described the settlement in 1086 as "waste".

Sir Gyles Penyston (fl. 13th century), whose family seat was in Cornwall (perhaps at Truro) before his time, and who is an ancestor of the Penyston Baronets, was styled of Penyston, denoting that he resided in Penistone.

Sheep
Sheep sales have been held in the town since before 1699, when the market received a royal charter and the area produced the now rare Penistone sheep.

Buildings
The town remained small until the coming of the railway in 1845, although several pre-19th century buildings survive. The oldest still standing is Penistone Church. This is the Grade I listed mediaeval parish church, St John the Baptist Church. The White Hart pub in the town dates from 1377. Penistone had a market for a long time before its royal charter was granted in 1699, although its historic livestock market was closed recently to make way for town centre re-development. A new landmark building has been built in Penistone for the Market Place. This is an oaken Cruck Barn and was built by Carpenter Oak of Totnes, Devon.

Railway

The Manchester, Sheffield and Lincolnshire Railway opened on 15 July 1845, on a route via Penistone, Dunford Bridge and the three-mile long Woodhead Tunnel. Construction conditions were difficult and 32 men died during the tunnel's construction, including 28 from cholera. 

The Penistone to Huddersfield railway line opened on 1 July 1850. Penistone became a railway junction, with a depot for engineering trains. Penistone station had frequent train services to Manchester, Sheffield and Huddersfield.

Penistone's 29-arch viaduct was built in 1849 by Messrs. Ingham and Bower. Stone was obtained from Walk Mill Bank, Oxspring, and was conveyed by a tramway on the side of the River Don. 
The second and third arches of Penistone Viaduct collapsed on 2 February 1916, when heavy rain weakened the foundations; the driver and fireman of a stationary goods locomotive were able to jump clear and survive the collapse. Cracks in the parapet had been observed some days earlier. The viaduct was repaired and was back in service in August of the same year.

The town was served by the Woodhead Line between Manchester London Road and Sheffield Victoria. Following major investment, which started in 1935 but was delayed by the Second World War, the electrification of the railway was completed in 1954 and the line's power control centre was built adjacent to Penistone station. The building still stands and has been converted for commercial use. The Woodhead Line was the first main line railway in the UK to be electrified, but its once-pioneering 1500 V DC system became non-standard.

Although the Beeching Report recommended the closure of the Hope Valley line and the retention of Woodhead services, the government chose to implement the opposite; Woodhead Line passenger services beyond Hadfield ended on 5 January 1970. Goods trains, mainly coal, continued to travel through the station for a further 11 years when the line was closed controversially between Penistone and Hadfield in July 1981; the track was lifted several years later. The route of the track is now used as part of the Trans-Pennine Trail.

Transport

Penistone railway station is on the Penistone Line, which provides passenger trains to Huddersfield, Barnsley and Sheffield. Services are generally hourly in each direction, operated by Northern Trains.

Bus services in the area are operated by Stagecoach Yorkshire, South Pennine Community Transport, Globe Holidays (Barnsley) and TM Travel. Routes connect Penistone with Barnsley, Holmfirth, Sheffield, Stocksbridge and Thurgoland.

Governance
Penistone was a parish in the wapentake of Staincross in the West Riding of Yorkshire and after 1837 was a member of the Wortley Poor law union.

Penistone was in the Barnsley West and Penistone constituency until the 2010 general election when it became part of the newly created Penistone and Stocksbridge constituency.

Barnsley Metropolitan Borough Council is responsible for local government issues and Penistone Town Council is responsible for local issues.

Geography
Penistone is situated on the south bank of the River Don. The parish, which included Gunthwaite, Hunshelf, Ingbirchworth, Langsett, Oxspring, and Thurlstone, covered 21,338 acres, mostly arable land and pasture and 2,000 acres of moorland. The underlying geology is the coal measures of the South Yorkshire Coalfield, from which some coal was mined in the 19th century, and sandstone flags were quarried.

Economy

Penistone has a thriving market, although smaller since the building of a Tesco supermarket in 2011, which reduced the market footprint. The cattle market, which was the centre of the farming livestock trade, and the Fur n Feathers market, have long since gone. At 747 ft, Penistone is among the highest market towns in Yorkshire.

The Market Cruck Barn was officially opened on 21 July 2011. Penistone Farmers' Market is a monthly farmers' market on the second Saturday of every month held in the market place.

Religion

 Saint John the Baptist Church – Church of England
 St Andrews Church – United Reformed Church
 Penistone Community Church

Radio station

Penistone has its own radio station. Penistone FM, formed in 2005, is a not-for-profit community radio which broadcasts on 95.7 FM. Ofcom granted it a licence to broadcast in December 2007. Test transmissions began in May 2009 and the station was officially launched in June 2009, with its licence running for five years. The licence was renewed for a further five years, to finish in June 2019.

Penistone is also served by commercial radio station Dearne FM, which broadcasts to Barnsley, Penistone and the Dearne Valley areas in South Yorkshire on the dedicated frequency of 97.1 FM. Test transmissions started in September 2003 on both 97.1 and the Barnsley and Dearne Valley frequency (102.0) before the station's official launch on 5 October 2003.

Sport and recreation
 The local football team is Penistone Church F.C., who play home matches at the Memorial Ground in Church View Road.
Penistone Cricket and Sports Club has a ground in Sheffield Road.
 Penistone Paramount Cinema
 Penistone Gymnastics Club
 Penistone Footpath Runners and Athletics Club
 Penistone Bowling Club, Back Lane.
 Quest Taekwondo Penistone

Education

Grammar school

Penistone Grammar School was founded in 1392. Notable former pupils include the blind mathematician Nicholas Saunderson, and Anne Campbell, who served as MP for Cambridge until May 2005. Most of the old school was demolished in 2011 and a new school built. Other local schools include St John's Primary School, Spring Vale Primary School and Thurlstone Primary School.

Events
Pancake Day. In the early 20th century it was the custom in the town for the church to ring a pancake bell on Shrove Tuesday.

March. Penistone Arts Weeks returned in 2022.

The annual Penistone Mayor's Parade Weekend is in June. It consists of two concerts, a parade and a gala.

The first Penistone Folk Festival took place in June 2011 in the Market Barn. This is planned to be an annual charity event and occurs at around the same date as the earlier 'Penistone Sing', on the festival of St John, to whom the parish church is dedicated.

Penistone Literary Festival ('Pen-Lit') was started in 2014.

August. On Yorkshire Day, 1 August 2006, the now annual gathering of lord mayors, mayors and other civic heads from Yorkshire was held at Penistone. The day included a service at the parish church, a parade around the town, films and an evening of music at the Paramount Cinema and an exhibition at St John's Community Centre, and Hartcliff Tower was opened to the public. There were Morris dancers, a farmers' market, a shop-window competition and a historic organ concert at St Andrews Church.

September. Penistone Show is an annual agricultural show. It is held on the second Saturday in September. As well as ordinary agricultural categories for sheep, cows, goats and poultry entries are received in horticulture, handicraft, show jumping, pigeons, dogs, photography and other categories.

Penistone's Annual Competitive Music Festival is held at Penistone Grammar School on the last Saturday of September. The event was founded by Millhouse Green Male Voice Choir and was in its 48th year in 2016.

Notable people
 Kate Rusby, folk singer born in Cawthorne.
 Rolo Tomassi, Experimental Rock Band.
 Rachael McShane, cellist from Bellowhead, folk band
 John Stones, footballer for Manchester City (previously Everton). Former Barnsley academy graduate.
 Chris Morgan, footballer, defender. Former Barnsley and Sheffield United captain.
 Marc Roberts, footballer, defender. Current Birmingham city player.
Scott High, footballer, midfielder. Current Huddersfield Town player.

Fairtrade Town
On 26 February 2007 the town was officially declared a Fairtrade Town.

Twin towns
  Grindavík, Iceland

See also
Listed buildings in Penistone

References

Further reading

External links

 Visit Penistone
 A Pictorial Tour of Penistone

 
Market towns in South Yorkshire
Towns and villages of the Peak District
Geography of the Metropolitan Borough of Barnsley
Towns in South Yorkshire
Civil parishes in South Yorkshire